Ahmed El Sheikh (born 11 September 1992) is an Egyptian professional footballer who plays as a winger for Egyptian club Al Masry SC and the Egypt national team.

International goals

Scores and results list Egypt's goal tally first.

Titles 
Al Ahly 
 Egyptian Premier League (4): 2015–16, 2017–18, 2018–19 , 2019-20
 Egypt Cup (1): 2019–20
 Egyptian Super Cup (2): 2015
 CAF Champions League (1): 2019–20

Individual
 Egyptian Premier League Top scorer: 2016–17

References

1992 births
Living people
Egyptian footballers
Telephonat Beni Suef SC players
Misr Lel Makkasa SC players
Al Ahly SC players
Egyptian Premier League players
Egyptian expatriate sportspeople in Saudi Arabia
Saudi Professional League players
Ettifaq FC players
Pyramids FC players
People from Beni Suef Governorate
Association football wingers
Egypt international footballers